Colin Priestner is a Canadian hockey executive, singer/songwriter, and athlete.

Career 

Colin is part-owner and Managing Partner of the Saskatoon Blades Hockey Club of the Western Hockey League. He is also a touring Canadian singer/songwriter.

Music 

Priestner's first record, Blatant Hypocrite, was independently released in 2005. It was followed in November 2006 with God and Wall Street. Despite critical acclaim and airplay in Canada, the album had little commercial success. In the fall of 2006, Priestner toured with Dan Bern during Bern's "Breathe" tour,
 and supported Josh Ritter on a Canadian tour in 2007.

Following the disappointing sales of God and Wall Street, Priestner abandoned his music career and began working as a car salesman.  After four years, during which time he became the Vice President of Norden Volkswagen Volkswagen, Priestner wrote and starred in "Shit Edmontonians Say," a parody video that spoofed Edmonton, Alberta.
It went viral and generated over 300,000 views in 24 hours. The video, which featured cameos from Edmonton Oilers Jordan Eberle and Ryan Nugent-Hopkins as well as other local celebrities, was featured on the front page of the Edmonton Sun and received significant coverage in other media, including regional news programs.
and new programs throughout the month.

Buoyed by the success of "Shit Edmontonians Say", Priestner returned to the stage in 2012 to perform at the Royal Alberta Museum Theatre. Soon after that, he left his job and began work on a new album.  It will be recorded in Vancouver with Grammy award winning producer Chin Injeti, the album is due for release in 2014.

Tennis 

Priestner was a top ranked junior tennis player, placed 5th in the Men's Open in Alberta, and was a participant in the Canadian National Junior Tennis Championships in 2000 and 2002. In 2002, he received a tennis scholarship to Eastern Illinois University, a Division 1 NCAA school. He played competitively for the Panthers for two years before returning home to Edmonton to record his first album. While in Edmonton, Priestner continued his education at the University of Alberta and played varsity tennis; he graduated in 2007 with a degree in political science.

Priestner regularly contributes to 630 CHED's Inside Sports as the channel's tennis correspondent.

Personal life 

Priestner's father, Mike Priestner, was a former WHL goaltender and is the majority owner of the Saskatoon Blades Hockey Club; his aunt, Cathy Priestner-Allinger won a silver medal in the 1976 Winter Olympics in speed skating and was the Director of Sport for the 2002 and 2010 Winter Olympic Games.
Colin married his long-time girlfriend Alanna Bateup on June 22, 2013, in Vancouver.

References 

1984 births
Living people
Canadian male singer-songwriters
Musicians from London, Ontario
Sportspeople from London, Ontario
21st-century Canadian male singers